The first USS Comber (SP-344) was a United States Navy minesweeper in commission from 1917 to 1919.

U,S. Navy career 
Comber was built in 1916 as a commercial fishing trawler of the same name by Manitowoc Shipbuilding Company at Manitowoc, Wisconsin. The U.S. Navy chartered Comber in 1917 for World War I service and commissioned her as USS Comber (SP-344) on 19 April 1917.

Fitted out as a minesweeper, Comber carried out minesweeping operations along the coast of New England in the 1st Naval District and 2nd Naval District, carried supplies, and patrolled in the Newport, Rhode Island, area. During the spring and summer of 1918, Comber made two voyages to Bermuda, convoying submarine chasers. After a brief tour of minesweeping in the 4th Naval District off Pennsylvania, southern New Jersey, and Delaware, Comber moved to Boston, Massachusetts to resume minesweeping operations off New England.

The Navy returned Comber to her owners on 2 April 1919.

References

Department of the Navy Naval Historical Center Online Library of Selected Images: U.S. Navy Ships: USS Comber (SP-344), 1917-1919
NavSource Onlline: Section Patrol Craft Photo Archive Comber (SP 344)

Merchant ships of the United States
Ships built in Manitowoc, Wisconsin
1916 ships
Minesweepers of the United States Navy
World War I minesweepers of the United States